SS Copenhagen is a shipwreck off the town of Lauderdale-by-the-Sea, Florida, United States. The single screw steamer was built in Sunderland, England in 1898, sinking in 1900. Located on the Pompano Dropoff reef south of Hillsboro Inlet, it became the fifth Florida Underwater Archaeological Preserve when it was dedicated in 1994. There is a plaque noting this distinction south of the wreck. This was followed on 31 May 2001 with its addition to the US National Register of Historic Places.

References

External links
 Museums in the Sea SS Copenhagen

 Broward County listings at National Register of Historic Places
 SS Copenhagen at Florida's Underwater Archaeological Preserves
  at 

National Register of Historic Places in Broward County, Florida
Shipwrecks of the Florida coast
Shipwrecks in the Atlantic Ocean
Maritime incidents in 1900
Shipwrecks on the National Register of Historic Places in Florida
Florida Underwater Archaeological Preserves
1898 ships
Ships built on the River Wear